Zaidee is a feminine given name which derived from the name Sadie, which is also derived from the name Sarah. It means princess in Hebrew.

List of people with the name 

 Zaidee C. Bliss, wife of Anson Goodyear
 Zaidee Jackson (1897–1970), American singer
 Zaidee Mary May, mother of Theresa May

Fictional characters 

 Zaidee, in Dying to Live

See also 

 Zaidi (surname)

Feminine given names